Rayanistes is a genus of remingtonocetid whale from the Middle Eocene deposits in Egypt.

Significance and biology
Rayanistes was capable of extensive power strokes during pelvic paddling, based on the robust hindlimb and innominate. The more
abducted orientation of its femur allowed for greater maneuverability of the hip joint in contrast to that of Remingtonocetus. The discovery of Rayanistes is significant because it shows that the most primitive non-pelagicete cetaceans were becoming widespread beyond the southern margin of the ancient Tethys sea.

References

Remingtonocetidae
Transitional fossils
Fossil taxa described in 2016
Prehistoric cetacean genera
Eocene mammals of Africa